Nanaimo-North Cowichan is a provincial electoral district in British Columbia, Canada, established by the Electoral Districts Act, 2008.  It is represented by Doug Routley (British Columbia New Democratic Party).

MLAs

Electoral history

References

British Columbia provincial electoral districts on Vancouver Island
Politics of Nanaimo